Emin Imamaliev (Azeri spelling: Emin İmaməliyev; born 7 August 1980 in Baku) is an Azerbaijani football midfielder who most recently played for FK Qarabağ in the AFFA Supreme League.

He has been capped 41 times for the Azerbaijan national football team. His only international goal secured Azerbaijan's 1–0 victory over Finland in an UEFA Euro 2008 qualifier in Baku.

National team statistics

International goals

Honors
FC Baku
 Azerbaijan Premier League: 2005–06

References

1980 births
Living people
Azerbaijani footballers
Azerbaijan international footballers
Footballers from Baku
Qarabağ FK players
Shamakhi FK players
Association football midfielders